Kayden Kiewit is a South African rugby union player for the  in the Currie Cup. His regular position is prop.

Kiewit was named in the  side for the 2022 Currie Cup Premier Division.

References

South African rugby union players
Living people
Rugby union props
SWD Eagles players
Boland Cavaliers players
Golden Lions players
Year of birth missing (living people)